Thaumatagrion is a genus of white-legged damselfly in the family Coenagrionidae. There is one described species in Thaumatagrion, T. funereum.

References

Further reading

 
 
 

Coenagrionidae
Articles created by Qbugbot